The Lapham-Grant Trophy is an annual singles and doubles squash event contested between the United States and Canada.  The location rotates between the U.S. and Canada, and features the top singles and doubles players from each country.  It is the oldest international doubles contest in the world.

References

External links 

 Official website and complete results:  The Lapham-Grant Matches – Since 1922

Recurring sporting events established in 1922
Squash tournaments
Squash in Canada
Squash in the United States